Hertog Jan is a restaurant first in Bruges, Belgium and from July 2014 on in Loppem - Zedelgem near Bruges. It is led by chefs Gert De Mangeleer and Joachim Boudens.

It is rated with 3 stars  by the Michelin Red Guide. As of 2012 one of only three restaurants in the country Belgium to be awarded such an honour.

On December 22, 2018 Hertog Jan closed its doors.

See also
 List of Michelin three starred restaurants

External links
 Hertog Jan official website

Restaurants in Bruges
Michelin Guide starred restaurants in Belgium
Companies based in West Flanders